is the first live video album by Japanese band Wagakki Band, released on November 26, 2014, by Avex Trax in two editions: two-disc DVD and single-disc Blu-ray. In addition, an Amazon Japan exclusive release includes a two-disc Audio CD version in each edition. The video covers the band's concert at the Akasaka Blitz on August 27, 2014.

The video peaked at No. 8 on Oricon's DVD chart and No. 23 on Oricon's Blu-ray chart.

Track listing
All tracks are arranged by Wagakki Band.

Personnel 
 Yuko Suzuhana – vocals
 Machiya – guitar, vocals ("Episode.0")
 Beni Ninagawa – tsugaru shamisen
 Kiyoshi Ibukuro – koto
 Asa – bass
 Daisuke Kaminaga – shakuhachi
 Wasabi – drums
 Kurona – wadaiko

Charts

References

External links 
 
  (Avex Group)
 
 

Wagakki Band video albums
2014 live albums
Japanese-language live albums
Avex Group video albums
Albums recorded at Akasaka Blitz